Pforzheim is an electoral constituency (German: Wahlkreis) represented in the Bundestag. It elects one member via first-past-the-post voting. Under the current constituency numbering system, it is designated as constituency 279. It is located in northwestern Baden-Württemberg, comprising the city of Pforzheim and the district of Enzkreis.

Pforzheim was created for the 1965 federal election. Since 2002, it has been represented by Gunther Krichbaum of the Christian Democratic Union (CDU).

Geography
Pforzheim is located in northwestern Baden-Württemberg. As of the 2021 federal election, it comprises the independent city of Pforzheim and the district of Enzkreis.

History
Pforzheim was created in 1965, then known as Pforzheim – Karlsruhe-Land I. It acquired its current name in the 1980 election. In the 1965 through 1976 elections, it was constituency 182 in the numbering system. In the 1980 through 1998 elections, it was number 183. In the 2002 and 2005 elections, it was number 280. Since the 2009 election, it has been number 279.

Originally, the constituency comprised the independent city of Pforzheim, the Landkreis Pforzheim district, and the municipalities of Auerbach, Bruchhausen, Burbach, Busenbach, Ettlingen, Ettlingenweier, Etzenrot, Forchheim, Grünwettersbach, Hohenwettersbach, Langensteinbach, Malsch, Mörsch, Mutschelbach, Neuburgweier, Oberweier, Palmbach, Pfaffenrot, Reichenbach, Schielberg, Schluttenbach, Schöllbronn, Spessart, Spielberg, Stupferich, Sulzbach, Völkersbach, Malsch, and Wolfartsweier from the Landkreis Karlsruhe district. In the 1980 through 1998 elections, it comprised the city of Pforzheim, the Enzkreis district, and the municipality of Oberderdingen from the Landkreis Karlsruhe district. It acquired its current borders in the 2002 election.

Members
The constituency has been held by Christian Democratic Union (CDU) during all but one Bundestag term since its creation. It was first represented by Siegfried Meister from 1965 to 1972, followed by Lutz Stavenhagen from 1972 to 1994. Roland Richter served one term before Ute Vogt of the Social Democratic Party (SPD) was elected in 1998. Gunther Krichbaum has been representative since 2002.

Election results

2021 election

2017 election

2013 election

2009 election

References

Federal electoral districts in Baden-Württemberg
1965 establishments in West Germany
Constituencies established in 1965
Pforzheim
Enzkreis